The Gulu Nature Reserve, part of the greater East London Coast Nature Reserve, is a coastal forest reserve in the Wild Coast region of the Eastern Cape, South Africa. The reserve lies between the Gxulu River estuary, located on its western side, and the Igoda River estuary on the eastern side.

History 
The  reserve was created in 1983 along with the Cape Henderson Nature Reserve and the Kwelera Nature Reserve for the conservation of the region's fauna and flora.

See also 

 List of protected areas of South Africa

References 

Nature reserves in South Africa
Eastern Cape Provincial Parks